The enzyme aconitate decarboxylase catalyzes the chemical reaction

cis-aconitate  itaconate + CO2

Hence, this enzyme has one substrate, cis-aconitate, and two products, itaconate and CO2.

This enzyme belongs to the family of lyases, specifically the carboxy-lyases, which cleave carbon-carbon bonds.  The systematic name of this enzyme class is cis-aconitate carboxy-lyase (itaconate-forming). Other names in common use include cis-aconitic decarboxylase, CAD, cis-aconitate carboxy-lyase, and cis-aconitate carboxy-lyase.  This enzyme participates in c5-branched dibasic acid metabolism.

References

 

EC 4.1.1
Enzymes of unknown structure